is a Japanese politician and has been the 53rd governor of Hyōgo-ken since the 1st of August, 2021. Hyōgo is a Prefecture in Japan.

References

External links 
 
 

University of Tokyo alumni
Politicians from Hyōgo Prefecture
1977 births
Living people
Governors of Hyōgo Prefecture